The Camarines Norte Provincial Board is the Sangguniang Panlalawigan (provincial legislature) of the Philippine province of Camarines Norte.

The members are elected via plurality-at-large voting: the province is divided into four districts, the first and fourth districts sending three members to the provincial board, while the second and third send two members; the number of candidates the electorate votes for and the number of winning candidates depends on the number of members their district sends. The vice governor is the ex officio presiding officer, and only votes to break ties. The vice governor is elected via the plurality voting system province-wide.

Beginning in 2010, the districts used in appropriation of members is coextensive with the legislative districts of Camarines Norte. Prior to 2010 when the province was just one congressional district, the Commission on Elections divided the province into two provincial board districts.

List of members
An additional three ex officio members are the presidents of the provincial chapters of the Liga ng mga Barangay, Philippine Councilors League, the Sangguniang Kabataan
provincial president; the municipal and city (if applicable) presidents of the Liga ng mga Barangay, Councilor's League and Sangguniang Kabataan, shall elect amongst themselves their provincial presidents which shall be their representatives at the board.

Current members 
These are the members after the 2022 local elections and 2018 barangay and SK elections:

 Vice Governor: Joseph V. Ascutia (Liberal Party)

Vice Governor

1st District

2nd District

Footnotes

References

External links 

 Official website

Provincial boards in the Philippines
Politics of Camarines Norte